Solar cycle 8 was the eighth solar cycle since 1755, when extensive recording of solar sunspot activity began. The solar cycle lasted 9.7 years, beginning in November 1833 and ending in July 1843.  The maximum smoothed sunspot number observed during the solar cycle was 244.9 (March 1837), and the starting minimum was 12.2.

Solar cycle 8 ended in 1843, the year that Heinrich Schwabe discovered the sunspot cycle.

See also
List of solar cycles

References

Solar cycles